Eliza Jane Scanlen (born 6 January 1999) is an Australian actress. She rose to prominence portraying Tabitha Ford in the Australian soap opera Home and Away (2016), before receiving critical acclaim by playing a troubled teenager in the HBO miniseries Sharp Objects (2018). In 2022, she starred in the Showtime series The First Lady as young Eleanor Roosevelt.

She made her film debut in 2019, with starring roles in the drama Babyteeth and Greta Gerwig's period drama Little Women.

Early life
Scanlen was born in Sydney, New South Wales, Australia, and has a fraternal twin sister named Annabel. She learned the piano when she was about 7 years old, but stopped playing when she was thirteen years old. In preparation for her role as Beth March in the 2019 film adaptation of Little Women, she started practising the piano again.

Career
While in high school, Scanlen was cast in the recurring role of Tabitha Ford on television soap opera Home and Away. Scanlen starred as the titular character in the 2018 short film Grace. She then achieved recognition for her portrayal of Amma Crellin in the HBO psychological thriller miniseries Sharp Objects, in which she stars alongside Amy Adams.

Scanlen made her professional theatre debut in Sydney Theatre Company's 2019 production of Lord of the Flies, directed by Kip Williams. She played the role of Eric for the play's run. She made her feature film debut as Milla Finlay in Shannon Murphy's Babyteeth, which premiered in competition at Venice Film Festival. In 2019, she portrayed Beth March in Greta Gerwig's adaptation of Louisa May Alcott's novel Little Women, co-starring alongside Saoirse Ronan, Emma Watson, Florence Pugh, Laura Dern, Timothée Chalamet, and Meryl Streep. The film received six Academy Award nominations (including Best Picture), and grossed $218 million at the box office.

In 2020, Scanlen portrayed Lenora in Antonio Campos thriller The Devil All the Time, based on Donald Ray Pollock book. In the same year she made her directional debut with the Australian short film Mukbang which received much controversy, she also wrote the screen play. In 2021, Scanlen co-starred in M. Night Shyamalan's thriller Old, which was released on 23 July.

In 2023, Scanlen had the lead role of Jem Starling in Laurel Parmet's directorial debut The Starling Girl. Scanlen received critical acclaim for her performance, with Ben Travers of IndieWire writing: "It helps that Scanlen's performance refuses to let this movie feel trite." Jason Bailey for The Playlist wrote: "Scanlen's work here is just as good, just as steeped in the feeling of a real-life being lived right in front of you."

Filmography

Film

Short

Television

Theater

References

External links
 

1999 births
21st-century Australian actresses
Living people
Fraternal twin actresses
Best Actress AACTA Award winners
People educated at Loreto Kirribilli
Australian twins
Actresses from Sydney
Australian film actresses
Australian television actresses
Australian stage actresses